The 2019 Ulster Senior Football Championship is the 131st instalment of the annual Ulster Senior Football Championship organised by Ulster GAA. It is one of the four provincial competitions of the 2019 All-Ireland Senior Football Championship. The winners receive The Anglo-Celt Cup. The draw for the championship was made on 12 October 2018.

Donegal were the defending champions, and successfully retained their title, defeating Cavan in the final.

Teams
The Ulster championship is contested by the nine county teams in the province of Ulster.

Championship draw

Matches

Preliminary round

Quarter-finals

Semi-finals

Final

See also
 2019 All-Ireland Senior Football Championship
 2019 Connacht Senior Football Championship
 2019 Leinster Senior Football Championship
 2019 Munster Senior Football Championship

References

External links
 http://ulster.gaa.ie/

2U
2019 in Northern Ireland sport
Ulster Senior Football Championship